Stannite is a mineral, a sulfide of copper, iron, and tin, in the category of thiostannates.

Background
The chemical formula Cu2FeSnS4. Zinc commonly occurs with the iron and trace germanium may be present. Stannite is used as an ore of tin, consisting of approximately 28% tin, 13% iron, 30% copper, 30% sulfur by mass. It is found in tin-bearing, hydrothermal vein deposits occurring with chalcopyrite, sphalerite, tetrahedrite, arsenopyrite, pyrite, cassiterite, and wolframite.

It is also known as bell metal ore as tin is an important constituent of bell-metal. It is thought the exploitation of tin deposits in Cornwall led to an expansion in bell founding. 

The name comes from the Latin for tin: stannum. It was first described in 1797 for an occurrence in Wheal Rock, St. Agnes, Cornwall, England.

See also 
 Kesterite

References

Copper minerals
Iron minerals
Tin minerals
Sulfide minerals
Tetragonal minerals
Minerals in space group 121